Diederich Arend von Rosenberg or Andrei Grigoryevich Rosenberg (1739–1813) was an Imperial Russian general who led troops against Ottoman Turkey, the Polish–Lithuanian Commonwealth and Republican France. During the War of the Second Coalition he capably led an army corps under the famous Alexander Suvorov at Cassano, Bassignana and the Trebbia. While in independent command, he badly defeated a French force under Edouard Mortier in the Battle of Muotathal on 1 October 1799.

In 1739, Rosenberg was born into a family belonging to the Baltic nobility. He joined the Imperial Russian army and fought against the Kingdom of Prussia in the Seven Years' War and Ottoman Turkey in the Russo-Turkish War of 1787–92. He also led troops against the Poles but it is not clear if it was during the Polish–Russian War of 1792 or the Kościuszko Uprising in 1794, or both.

In 1798 Rosenberg was assigned to lead the first echelon of the Russian army sent to assist Habsburg Austria in Italy during the War of the Second Coalition. During his corps' passage across Habsburg territory, Rosenberg kept strict discipline among his soldiers while ensuring that his hosts kept up their end of the bargain with regard to providing his men with food and living quarters. Rosenberg was remembered as being highly professional and concerned with the welfare of his men, but aloof in his dealings with the rank and file. In his first meeting with the new army commander he did not make a good impression on Alexander Suvorov. Nevertheless, he was reassigned to lead the second echelon when Wilhelm Derfelden assumed command of Rosenberg's original corps.

Notes

References

1739 births
1813 deaths
Russian generals
Baltic nobility
Military leaders of the French Revolutionary Wars
Russian military personnel of the French Revolutionary Wars